4th National Board of Review Awards
December 22, 1932
The 4th National Board of Review Awards were announced on December 22, 1932.

Top Ten Films 
I Am a Fugitive from a Chain Gang
As You Desire Me
A Bill of Divorcement
A Farewell to Arms
Madame Racketeer
Payment Deferred
Scarface
Tarzan the Ape Man
Trouble in Paradise
Two Seconds

Top Foreign Films 
À nous la liberté
Der Andere
The Battle of Gallipoli
Golden Mountains
Kameradschaft
Mädchen in Uniform
Der Raub der Mona Lisa
Reserved for Ladies
Road to Life
Zwei Menschen

Winners 
Best Film: I Am a Fugitive from a Chain Gang
Best Foreign Film: À nous la liberté

External links 
National Board of Review of Motion Pictures :: Awards for 1932

1932
1932 film awards
1932 in American cinema